CiaoWeb was an Italian web portal started up by the FIAT Group with an initial investment of 200 billion Italian Lira (100 million Euro). The project for the development of the portal had been assigned to a group of companies under the control of Ernst & Young and under the responsibility of Alessandro Gadotti, at the time Partner in Ernst & Young. Paolo Ceretti from IFIL then took the responsibility as CEO, and Nino Olivotto took the position of CTO.

History
The original project was a mix of editorial content and e-commerce based on the potential synergies between the companies of the FIAT Group (La Stampa, Alpitour, Ferrari, etc.). 

In 2000, CiaoWeb became the sponsor of the football team Juventus.

CiaoWeb did not survive the new economy crisis in 2001, and was sold to Hachette Rusconi Interactif (HRI), later on sold to Hearst.

References

Online retailers of Italy
Web portals
Internet properties established in 1999
1999 establishments in Italy
Defunct websites